The Sung Am Archives of Classical Literature is a literature museum in Seoul, South Korea.

See also
List of museums in South Korea

Museums in Seoul
Literary museums in South Korea